Marko Popović (Serbian Cyrillic: Марко Поповић; born 25 August 1982 in Resava) is a Serbian footballer.

Career
He began his career in the youth teams of the famous Serbian club Red Star Belgrade. Later he played for FK Jedinstvo and FK Leotar Trebinje. He has been playing for NK Maribor in the Slovenian First League from 2006 until January 2010, when he moved to Israel to play with F.C. Ashdod.

Honours
 Leotar
Champion of Premier League of Bosnia and Herzegovina in 2003
 Maribor
Winner of the Slovenian PrvaLiga in 2008–09

See also
List of NK Maribor players

External sources
Profile at Playerhistory. 
Stats from Slovenia at PrvaLiga 
Profile and interview at NK Maribor official website
Profile and news at Sedlare.org. 

1982 births
Living people
Serbian footballers
Association football fullbacks
Serbian expatriate footballers
FK Leotar players
Slovenian PrvaLiga players
NK Maribor players
Expatriate footballers in Slovenia
Israeli Premier League players
F.C. Ashdod players
Expatriate footballers in Israel
FK Jagodina players
HŠK Zrinjski Mostar players
FK Sloga Petrovac na Mlavi players